Kida (written: 木田, 喜田, 貴田 or 気田) is a Japanese surname. Notable people with the surname include:

, Japanese photographer
, Japanese voice actress
Fred Kida (1920–2014), American comics artist
, Japanese footballer
, Japanese baseball pitcher
, Japanese sprinter
, Japanese footballer
, Japanese sport shooter
, Japanese alpine skier
, Japanese long-distance swimmer

Other people
Jikoi Kida (born 1980), Fijian cricketer

Japanese-language surnames